Flen (local pronunciation Flén) is a locality and the seat of Flen Municipality, Södermanland County, Sweden with 6,229 inhabitants in 2010.

Flen evolved as a railway junction and got the title of a city in 1949. Since 1971 it is the seat of the much larger Flen Municipality.

Other things which made Flen famous is "Violen från Flen", a song written by Ulf Peder Olrog in the 1940s. The town also plays an important role in "Du ringde från Flen", 1992 dansband song by Grönwalls. The town is also mentioned in the Kent songs "Flen/Paris" on the 2005 EP The hjärta & smärta EP and "Ensam lång väg hem" on the 2010 album En plats i solen.

Flen is also famous for having the world's northernmost vineyard, in Blacksta.

Riksdag elections 
This list charts the urban area of Flen itself rather than the namesake municipality of which Flen is the seat.

References 

Populated places in Södermanland County
Populated places in Flen Municipality
Municipal seats of Södermanland County
Swedish municipal seats